Television Off, Party On is the debut extended play by American pop punk band Forever the Sickest Kids. It was released on July 3, 2007.

Track listing
"Believe Me, I'm Lying" – 3:03
"She's a Lady" – 4:00
"Becky Starz" – 4:02
"Breakdown" – 3:34
"I Don't Know About You, But I Came to Dance" – 3:21

Reception
Reviewers say that this was only the beginning of the rise of Forever the Sickest Kids and will continue to grow. "It's the type of feel good music that'll give you the urge to dance your little hearts out and even give people who are sick of the genre a reason to listen to."

References

External links
Television Off, Party On at Smart Punk

2007 debut EPs
Forever the Sickest Kids albums